Crustoderma dryinum is a species of crust fungus in the family Meruliaceae, and the type species of the genus Crustoderma. It is found in Europe and Asia, where it causes a brown rot on conifer wood.

References

Fungi described in 1873
Fungi of Asia
Fungi of Europe
Meruliaceae
Taxa named by Miles Joseph Berkeley